The A14, also called Autoestrada do Baixo Mondego, is a motorway in Portugal that connects Coimbra with Figueira da Foz, both belonging to the Região de Coimbra, in the Central Region, with a total length of .

In Coimbra, the motorway starts in the north of the city, having a junction with the A1, which heads south towards Lisbon and north towards Porto, and with the IP3, which heads east towards Viseu. Arriving before the city of Figueira da Foz, the motorway has a junction with the A13, which heads south to Leiria and north to Aveiro.

Sea breeze has been the concessionaire since the beginning of the highway's entry into service. The motorway has a conventional toll system between Coimbra and Montemor-o-Velho, until Figueira da Foz is free. Current toll prices for the entire motorway journey are €2.50 for class C1, €4.50 for class C2, €5.75 for class C3 and €6.40 for class C4.

Section

Capacity

Traffic
Between Figueira da Foz and the junction with the A17 there is the highest daily traffic on the motorway, exceeding more than 20 thousand vehicles daily. Continuing to Ançã, traffic is reduced, not exceeding 7,000 vehicles a day. Arriving in Coimbra, traffic increases again with the junction with the A1, surpassing more than 10 thousand vehicles daily and following to the Tolls of Coimbra North the traffic increases to 20 thousand vehicles daily.

References 

Motorways in Portugal
1994 establishments in Portugal